The 2006 South Africa rugby union tour of Ireland and England was a series of matches played in November and December 2006 in Ireland and England by South Africa national rugby union team.

The Springboks, coached by Jake White lost the test with Ireland, drew the series (1–1) to England and won against a World XV selection.

Results

First test in Dublin 
A bad defeat against Ireland, that had never before scored four tries against Springboks in a century. In the first half, Irish, made three tries that exposed the poor defence of Pierre Spies in particular and Bryan Habana out of position at 13. Spies was twice caught charging out of the line and the Irish swiftly punished that opening each time. The Springboks, fielding a largely experimental side, fought hard as Habana and debutant Francois Steyn dotted down in the second half. That comeback was roundly ended by Horgan after O'Driscoll expertly put him away to seal the game.

The match celebrate the centenary of the first Springboks tour and South Africa played in the kit worn by the 1906 touring squad, which was captained by Paul Roos.

Second test with England 
Next up was a two test encounter against England at fortress Twickenham. The Springboks had not beaten England since the Spring Tour of 2000 where the Boks won 18–13. England exacted revenge a week later and had built a period of dominance spanning six years. Even more disconcerting was that the Boks had not won at Twickenham since 1997; this leaving the Boks with a nine-year hoodoo to break. The Boks dominated England for much of the first test and seemed certain of victory until a late try by Phil Vickery gave England the result. A key turning point in the game was the injury to Butch James. His replacement, André Pretorius failed to deliver the steadiness Butch provided and missed an important penalty.

The revenge with England 
The final analysis was that this was a year of growth as much as it was a disappointing lost opportunity. Injuries to Schalk Burger (broken neck), Bakkies Botha (calf surgery), Jean De Villiers (cracked rib), Bryan Habana (cracked rib), Butch James (groin and knee), André Pretorius (groin), Joe Van Niekerk (C5 & C6 vertebrae), Jacques Cronje (cracked rib), Danie Rossouw (hamstring), Juan Smith (left quadriceps), Eddie Andrews (back), BJ Botha (back surgery), CJ Van Der Linde (Leg), Gurthro Steenkamp (broken hand), Pedrie Wannenburg (wrist surgery), Marius Joubert (fractured hand) amongst other lesser injuries stretched the Bok's depth to its limit. The blessing was that it allowed the Boks to break their reliance on certain individuals and expand their depth in blooding new players and testing new combinations. Francois Steyn was undoubtedly the find of the season alongside the elusive Ruan Pienaar. Jake also found depth in Wynand Olivier and Pierre Spies; the former being used extensively in plugging gaps left by injuries in the backline. Jake lamented the many lost opportunities of this campaign but was optimistic about the various changes they made to their defensive patterns and saw it as an important learning cuve ahead of the World Cup the following year

The final match against World XV 

 source:

References

2006 rugby union tours
2006 in South African rugby union
2006
2006–07 in European rugby union
2006–07 in English rugby union
2006–07 in Irish rugby union
2006
2006